Special Ops 1.5: The Himmat Story is a Hindi action thriller fiction webseries created and directed by Neeraj Pandey for Disney+ Hotstar. The series is set inside the Special Ops Universe and stars Kay Kay Menon as Himmat Singh. The series premiered on 12 November 2021.

Cast 
 Kay Kay Menon as Himmat Singh
 Aftab Shivdasani as Vijay Kumar
 Vinay Pathak as Sub Inspector Abbas Sheikh, Delhi Police
 Aadil Khan as Maninder Singh
 Gautami Kapoor as Saroj
 Parmeet Sethi as Naresh Chadha
 Kali Prasad Mukherjee as D. K. Banerjee 
 Kishor Kadam as Mondal
 Vijay Vikram Singh as Naval Commodore Chintamani Sharma
 Aishwarya Sushmita as Karishma
 Shantanu Ghatak as Vinayak Shukla
 Shiv Jyoti as Anita Sharma
 Nikhat Khan as Meenakshi Sharma
 Purnendu Bhattacharya as Mathur 
 Vivek Madaan as Sankalp Chaudhary
 Maria Ryaboshapka as Natasha
 Harssh A. Singh as Mahendra Chautala
 Sushil Tyagi as SP. Sushil Sharma
 Karan Tacker as Farooq Ali (special appearance)

Episodes

Production 
The series was formally announced by Disney+ Hotstar in January 2021 with Kay Kay Menon attached to star. In the same month Aftab Shivdasani joined the cast.

Filming 
The series started production in February, 2021. The series was shot in Ukraine in July 2021, with the Ukraine leg of the shoot completed in Kyiv in the same month.

Release 
The four-episode series premiered on Disney+ Hotstar on November 12, 2021, as part of Disney+ Day.

Promotion 
A teaser of the show was released on 14 October 2021 on the social media handles of Disney+ Hotstar. The trailer was leaked online before its official release on October 19, 2021.

Reception 
Archika Khurana writing for The Times of India commented "Kay Kay Menon’s Himmat Singh leaves a lasting impression as a RAW agent" rating 3 out of 5 stars.

Manik Sharma writing for Firstpost noted, "It is understandable that Special Ops 1.5 is a detour to make Himmat Singh more personable, instead of the maverick he was shown in the first season, but the story is too disjointed to pull this narrative heist off."

Udita Jhunjhunwala writing for Scroll noted that Special Ops 1.5 feels like an appetiser and a palate cleanser while we wait for the main course, because there's clearly more to come from Neeraj Pandey, Menon, Himmat Singh and his special ops team.

Bhavna Agarwal from Bollywood Bubble commented "Neeraj Pandey's approach to the story with his lenses and storyline is the strength of the prequel backed by a fluid screenplay. Kay Kay Menon returns as Himmat Singh along with Aftab Shivdasani and Vinay Pathak in pivotal roles."

Prateek Sur received the show positively and rated it 3.5 out of 5.

Sequel 
In April 2022, Neeraj Pandey confirmed that the third season of Special OPS is under production and will be released in early 2023.

References

External links
 

Hindi-language Disney+ Hotstar original programming
2021 Indian television series debuts
Indian thriller television series
Indian action television series
Hindi-language television shows
Research and Analysis Wing in fiction